is a former Japanese football player and manager.

Playing career
Harasaki was born in Fujisaki, Aomori on August 13, 1974. After graduating from high school, he joined Fujita Industries (later Bellmare Hiratsuka) in 1993. He debuted in 1995 and he played many matches as defensive midfielder. In 1999, he moved to newly promoted J2 League club, Omiya Ardija. He became a regular player there also as a defensive midfielder. In 2004, he moved to Vegalta Sendai. He retired at the end of the 2004 season.

Club statistics

Managerial statistics
Update; September 14, 2022

Honours 
Individual

 Monthly Best coach: 2022(May)

References

External links

Vegalta Sendai 

1974 births
Living people
Association football people from Aomori Prefecture
Japanese footballers
J1 League players
J2 League players
Japan Football League (1992–1998) players
Shonan Bellmare players
Omiya Ardija players
Vegalta Sendai players
Association football midfielders
J1 League managers
J2 League managers
Vegalta Sendai managers